La casa imaginaria is a Spanish-language opera by Gustavo Díaz-Jerez to a libretto by Pilar Mateos based on the 1994 short story by the same author.  It premiered at the Auditorio de León (Spain) on November 9, 2018, and was sold out for its two performances. The music uses musical material drawn from algorithmic procedures, as well as Iamus computer bio-inspired approach to music composition.

References

 
 
 

Spanish-language operas
2018 operas
Operas based on novels
Operas